The Nawijn Group is a Dutch right-wing Fortuynist political faction founded by Hilbrand Nawijn, a member of the Dutch House of Representatives. It was founded in June 2005 when Nawijn split from his previous party Pim Fortuyn List (LPF). It remained a one-man faction in the parliament until August 2006 when LPF parliamentary chairman Gerard van As joined Nawijn after also abandoning the LPF. Nawijn also participated in the Zoetermeer 2006 city council elections and won five seats under the name Lijst Hilbrand Nawijn, but like Leefbaar Rotterdam and the Pim Fortuyn List both led by Pim Fortuyn in the 2002 elections, these are separate entities. In August 2006 Nawijn announced that he planned to participate in the 2006 Dutch general elections under the banner of the Party for the Netherlands (Partij voor Nederland).

External links
Van As Steps From LPF to Group Nawijn (Dutch)
Nawijn Comes with' Party for Netherlands' (Dutch)

Defunct nationalist parties in the Netherlands
Conservative parties in the Netherlands
Right-wing populism in the Netherlands